Patrick Fradj is a French footballer who plays as a right-back for US Tourcoing FC.

External links

References

1992 births
Living people
Association football defenders
French footballers
Ligue 2 players
RC Lens players
Iris Club de Croix players
People from Saint-Saulve
Sportspeople from Nord (French department)
Footballers from Hauts-de-France